Cowdray may refer to:

Cowdray House, the ruins of one of England's great houses, outside the West Sussex town of Midhurst
Cowdray Park, Gauteng, suburb of Johannesburg, South Africa
Cowdray Park, West Sussex, country house at the centre of the 16,500-acre (67 km2) Cowdray Estate
Viscount Cowdray, of Cowdray in the County of Sussex, is a title in the Peerage of the United Kingdom
Weetman Pearson, 1st Viscount Cowdray GCVO (1856–1927), engineer, oil industrialist, and owner of the Pearson conglomerate
Weetman Pearson, 2nd Viscount Cowdray, DL (1882–1933), British peer and Liberal Party politician